Sphenomorphus shelfordi  is a species of skink found in Indonesia and Malaysia.

References

shelfordi
Taxa named by George Albert Boulenger
Reptiles described in 1900
Reptiles of Borneo